Harry Simpson was a baseball player.

Harry Simpson may also refer to:

Harry Simpson (Australian footballer) (born 1928), Australian rules footballer for South Melbourne
Harry Simpson (English footballer) (1875–?), English footballer for Crewe Alexandra and Stoke
Harry Simpson (footballer, born 1869), Scottish footballer for Stoke
Harry Simpson (footballer, born 1888) (1888–1951), Scottish footballer
Harry Simpson (golfer) (1885–1955), English professional golfer
Harry Simpson (politician) (1886—1967), municipal politician in East York, Ontario, Canada

See also
Henry Simpson (disambiguation)
Harold Simpson (disambiguation)